Mahesh Thakur is an Indian actor who has played roles in many films, TV serials and web series. He has authored a book titled I-Quotes which was published in early 2021 by Popular Prakashan.

Filmography

Films

Television

Bibliography

References

External links
 
 

1969 births
Living people
Indian male film actors
Male actors in Hindi cinema
Indian male television actors
Male actors from Mumbai